Kilij Arslan, meaning Sword Lion in Turkish, was the name of four sultans of the Seljuk Sultanate of Rûm:

Kilij Arslan I reigned as of 1092, died 1107
Kilij Arslan II reigned as of 1156, died 1192
Kilij Arslan III reigned as of 1204, died 1205
Kilij Arslan IV reigned as of 1248, died 1265